Syn-copalyl-diphosphate synthase (OsCyc1, OsCPSsyn, syn-CPP synthase, syn-copalyl diphosphate synthase) is an enzyme with systematic name 9alpha-copalyl-diphosphate lyase (decyclizing). This enzyme catalyses the following chemical reaction

 geranylgeranyl diphosphate  9alpha-copalyl diphosphate

This enzyme requires a divalent metal ion, preferably Mg2+, for activity.

References

External links 
 

EC 5.5.1